Luis Ernesto Michel Vergara (born 21 July 1979) is a Mexican football manager and a former professional footballer who last played as a goalkeeper for Liga MX club Tijuana. Michel has captained both Guadalajara and the Mexico national team in official matches, captaining the latter in the 2011 Copa América.

Club career
On January 6, 2014, Guadalajara loaned Michel to Costa Rican club Deportivo Saprissa for six months, with Saprissa having the option of extending the deal for an extra six months.

International career
Michel was called up to the 2010 FIFA World Cup, but he did not play in the tournament.

Career statistics

International

Honours
Guadalajara
Mexican Primera División: Apertura 2006

Saprissa
Costa Rican Primera División: Clausura 2014

Mexico
CONCACAF Gold Cup: 2011

Individual
Mexican Primera División Golden Glove: Clausura 2008

References

External links

1979 births
Living people
Mexico international footballers
C.D. Guadalajara footballers
Santos Laguna footballers
Deportivo Saprissa players
Liga MX players
Mexican expatriate footballers
Mexican footballers
Expatriate footballers in Costa Rica
2010 FIFA World Cup players
2011 CONCACAF Gold Cup players
2011 Copa América players
CONCACAF Gold Cup-winning players
Footballers from Guadalajara, Jalisco
Association football goalkeepers